Seán Smyth is an Irish fiddle player from Galway. Smyth is an All-Ireland champion on both fiddle and whistle. He is known for his performances with the traditional Irish music group Lúnasa.

Early life
Smyth was born in Straide, County Mayo.

Career
Smyth's 1993 solo debut, The Blue Fiddle, was named one of the ten best albums of that year by The Irish Echo. Smyth toured in Scandinavia  in support of the album with guitarist Donogh Hennessey, bassist Trevor Hutchinson. The three, along with low whistle player Michael McGoldrick, and piper John McSherry, toured in Australia in early 1997.

The five became the Irish traditional music group Lúnasa in 1997 and has performed with them for many years, touring internationally and recording a number of albums.

Other recordings on which Seán appears include Ceol Tigh Neachtain, Music at Matt Molloy's, Brendan O'Regan's A Wind of Change, Alan Kelly's Out of the Blue, Mosaic, and Dónal Lunny's Coolfin.

References

External links
Lúnasa Homepage

Living people
Year of birth missing (living people)
Irish fiddlers
Lúnasa (band) members
21st-century violinists